Garhi Yasin is an administrative subdivision (Tehsil) of Shikarpur District, Sindh Pakistan.
Madeji and Dakhan are two big town beside Garhi Yasin itself in taluka.

Shikarpur District
Talukas of Sindh